The 2000–01 season was Fulham's 103rd season in professional football, competing in the Football League Division 1. This season for Fulham was of note, as they gained promotion to the Premier League and ran away with the Division 1 title with 101 points, with a 10-point margin over runners-up Blackburn Rovers. The manager was former Monaco manager Jean Tigana's first season at Craven Cottage after Paul Bracewell's sacking toward the end of the 1999–2000 season.

Players

First-team squad

Left club during season

Final league table

Matches

Pre-season friendlies

Division 1

Results per matchday

League Cup

FA Cup

References

Notes

Fulham F.C. seasons
Fulham